The Contagious Diseases (Animals) Act is a series of Acts of Parliament of the United Kingdom to deal with the possibility of the accrual of economic harm or intra-species contamination. In 1892, the local authorities were not making sufficient use of powers to combat animal diseases so the Act introduced central control over the slaughter of infected animals and the payment of compensation. The 1893 Act transferred from local authorities to the Board of Agriculture the responsibility for wiping out swine fever. It was followed by the 20th-century series notation Diseases of Animals Act. Rabid dogs were included in 1878.

Contagious Diseases (Animals) Act 1853
Contagious Diseases, Animals Act 1856
Contagious Diseases (Animals) Act 1867
Contagious Diseases (Animals) Act 1869
Contagious Diseases (animals) (Scotland) Act 1875
Contagious Diseases (Animals) Act 1878
Contagious Diseases (Animals) Act 1884
Contagious Diseases (Animals) Transfer of Parts of Districts Act 1884
Contagious Diseases (Animals) Act 1886
Contagious Diseases Acts Repeal Act 1886
Contagious Diseases (Animals) (Pleuro-pneumonia) Act 1890
Contagious Diseases (Animals) Act 1892
Contagious Diseases (Animals) Act 1893

The Contagious Diseases (Animals) Acts 1878 and 1884 was the collective title of the Contagious Diseases (Animals) Act 1878 and the Contagious Diseases (Animals) Act 1884.

The Contagious Diseases (Animals) Acts 1878 to 1886 was the collective title of the Contagious Diseases (Animals) Acts 1878 and 1884, the Contagious Diseases (Animals) Transfer of Parts of Districts Act 1884 and the Contagious Diseases (Animals) Act 1886.

The Contagious Diseases (Animals) Acts 1878 to 1890 was the collective title of Contagious Diseases (Animals) Acts 1878 to 1886 and the Contagious Diseases (Animals) (Pleuro-pneumonia) Act 1890.

References
Lely, John Mounteney. "Animals (Diseases)". The Statutes of Practical Utility. (Chitty's Statutes). Fifth Edition. Sweet and Maxwell. Stevens and Sons. London. 1894. Volume 1. Title "Animals". Pages 18 to 70.

History of agriculture in the United Kingdom
Animal viral diseases
Animal virology
Agricultural health and safety
Food law